Ostrá may refer to: 

Ostrá (Nymburk District), a village and municipality in Czech Republic
Ostrá (Veľká Fatra), a mountain in Slovakia
Ostrá Lúka, a village and municipality in Slovakia

See also
Ostra (disambiguation)